Coleophora zhusani is a moth of the family Coleophoridae. It is found in Turkestan and Uzbekistan.

The larvae feed on the leaves of Artemisia turanica. They create a silky, sheathlike case, with the end curved downward, oblique sinuous wrinkles and comparatively weak longitudinal grooves. The valve is two-sided. The length of the case is 10-11.5 mm and the color of the fresh case is pale pinkish-ocherous with a darker margin. The silky part of the hibernation case is dark brown. Larvae can be found in the beginning of June and (after diapause) again from April to May. Young larvae hibernate.

References

zhusani
Moths described in 1972
Moths of Asia